Kalbfleisch is a German surname. Notable people with this surname include:

George Randolph Kalbfleisch (1931–2006), US physicist
Girard Edward Kalbfleisch (1899–1990), US judge
James G. Kalbfleisch (1940–2017), Canadian academic
Martin Kalbfleisch (1804–1873), Dutch-American politician
Walter Kalbfleisch (1911–1960), Canadian hockey player

See also
F. W. Kalbfleisch, a former Germany publishing company

German-language surnames